Alexandre-Vincent Pineux Duval (6 April 1767, in Rennes – 1 September 1842, in Paris) was a French dramatist, sailor, architect, actor, theatre manager. He was the eighth member elected to occupy seat 4 of the Académie française in 1812.

Duval was brother to the diplomat Amaury Duval (1760–1838).

Bibliography
 Les Projets de mariage (1790)
 Les Tuteurs vengés (1794)
La Manie d'être quelque chose (1795)
Le Défenseur officieux (1795)
La Jeunesse de Richelieu (1796)
Les Héritiers ou le Naufrage, comédie en 1 acte et en prose (représentée pour la première fois le 27 novembre 1796)
Maison à vendre (1800) ;
Édouard en Écosse (1801), en 3 actes et en prose
Guillaume le Conquérant (1803)
Shakespeare amoureux (1804)
Le Menuisier de Livonie (1805) 
Le Tyran domestique, en 5 actes et en vers (1805)
La Jeunesse d'Henri V, en 3 actes (1806)
Le faux Stanislas (1809)
Le Chevalier d'industrie en 5 actes et en vers (1809)
Le Retour d'un croisé, parodie des mélodrames alors en vogue (1810)
La Manie des grandeurs, en 5 actes et en vers (1817)
 La manie des grandeurs (1817)
 Le Faux Bonhomme (1821)
La Fille d'honneur, en 5 actes et en vers (1819)

Libretti
Le Prisonnier, musique de Domenico Della-Maria, créé le 10 pluviôse an VI, Opéra-Comique (salle Favart) ;
Le Vieux Château, musique de Domenico Della-Maria, créé le 25 ventôse an VI, théâtre Feydeau ;
L'Oncle valet, musique de Domenico Della-Maria, créé le 18 frimaire an VII, Opéra-Comique (salle Favart) ;
Le Trente et Quarante, ou le Portrait, musique d'Angelo Tarchi, créé le 17 floréal an VI, Opéra-Comique (salle Favart) ;
La Maison du Marais ou Trois ans d'absence, musique de Domenico Della-Maria, créé le 17 brumaire an VIII, Opéra-Comique (salle Favart) ;
Maison à vendre, musique de Nicolas Dalayrac, créé le 1er brumaire an IX, Opéra-Comique (salle Favart) ;
Joseph, opéra biblique en trois actes, musique d'Étienne-Nicolas Méhul, créé le 17 février 1807, Opéra-Comique (théâtre Feydeau).

He also published a collection of his works in 9 volumes (1812–1825).

Notes

References
 

1767 births
1842 deaths
Members of the Académie Française
Officiers of the Légion d'honneur
Writers from Rennes
19th-century French dramatists and playwrights
French librettists
French theatre managers and producers
Actors from Rennes
Businesspeople from Rennes